Amara Baby (born 23 February 1989) is a Senegalese professional footballer who plays as a midfielder.

Club career 
On 8 June 2020, Baby completed a free transfer from Antwerp to Eupen.

International career
Born in France and of Senegalese descent, Baby made his international debut for the Senegal national football team in a 3–1 2017 Africa Cup of Nations qualification win over Burundi on 13 June 2015.

References

External links
 
 

1989 births
Living people
People from Le Blanc-Mesnil
Footballers from Seine-Saint-Denis
Citizens of Senegal through descent
Senegalese footballers
Senegal international footballers
French sportspeople of Senegalese descent
French footballers
Ligue 2 players
LB Châteauroux players
Le Mans FC players
Stade Lavallois players
AJ Auxerre players
Association football fullbacks
R. Charleroi S.C. players
Royal Antwerp F.C. players
K.A.S. Eupen players
Belgian Pro League players
Senegalese expatriate footballers
French expatriate footballers
Senegalese expatriate sportspeople in Belgium
French expatriate sportspeople in Belgium
Expatriate footballers in Belgium